Ritu Arya (born 17 September 1988) is an English actress. She first became known for her role as Dr. Megan Sharma in the soap opera Doctors (2017), for which she was nominated for a British Soap Award. She gained further recognition for her roles as Flash in the sci-fi series Humans (2016–2018) and Lila Pitts in the Netflix superhero series The Umbrella Academy (2019–present).

Early life 
Ritu Arya's mother and father both work in real estate. She is of Indian descent and has two brothers, Romi and Rahul. Arya began acting as a teenager. Arya obtained a BSc in astrophysics from the University of Southampton and trained at the Oxford School of Drama.

Career 
Following a series of roles in short films, Arya played the recurring role of Dr. Megan Sharma in the British soap opera Doctors, for which she was nominated for a British Soap Award for Best Newcomer in 2017. She had a guest appearance in the series Sherlock in 2014, and later had a recurring role as the android Flash in the series Humans from 2016 to 2018. In 2019, Arya appeared as Jenna in the film Last Christmas, which was a commercial success. The following year, she had a recurring role as Lava in the Netflix series Feel Good and guest starred in the series Doctor Who.

In 2020, Arya starred as Lila Pitts in the second season of Netflix original series The Umbrella Academy, which earned her praise; she reprised the character in the series' third season, which was released in 2022. She is currently dating The Umbrella Academy co-star David Castaneda. Bustle magazine described her performance in the series as "scene-stealing" and Uproxx called Arya the "wild-card" of the show. In 2021, Arya co-starred in the Netflix film Red Notice. She will also appear in Greta Gerwig's Barbie, set for release in 2023.

Arya was a drummer and part of the band KIN, who released their debut single "Sharing Light" in April 2020. Their follow-up single "L.O.V.E." premiered on 6 August 2020. On 16 October 2022, KIN released a statement saying that Arya had left the band and her last live show with them was on 14 October 2022 in London.

Filmography

Film

Television

Theatre

References

External links
 

Living people
Alumni of the Oxford School of Drama
British actresses of Indian descent
English television actresses
English film actresses
Alumni of the University of Southampton
21st-century English actresses
English drummers
English women musicians
English people of Indian descent
1988 births
British women drummers
21st-century drummers
People from Guildford
Actresses from Surrey
Year of birth uncertain